Ten Cents a Dance is the title of several films:

Ten Cents a Dance (1931 film), starring Barbara Stanwyck and Ricardo Cortez
Ten Cents a Dance (1945 film), starring Jane Frazee
Ten Cents a Dance: Parallax, a 1985 film by Midi Onodera